= Yomidun =

Nigerian influencer

- Born: Raheem Aishat Olabisi; Oyo, Nigeria
- Occupations: Influencer; Model

TikTok information
- Page: Yomidun
- Followers: 630.2k
- Last updated: 18 September 2025

Raheem Aishat Olabisi professionally known Yomidun is a Nigerian influencer and model.

== Early life and career ==
Yomidun was born and raised in Ibadan, Oyo State.

She started her career as a fashion model and later turned to becoming an influencer.

Yomidun has received brand ambassador deals with brands like Platnova, Tecno Mobile smartphone launched in 2024, Australian Fashion brand BabyBoo, and Fashion Nova.
